Elisabeth Abanda and Katarena Paliivets were the defending champions, but Paliivets chose not to participate. Abanda partnered up with Yawna Allen but lost in the first round.

Alexandra Mueller and Asia Muhammed won the tournament defeating Eugenie Bouchard and Megan Moulton-Levy in the final 6–3, 3–6, [10–7].

Seeds

Draw

Draw

References
 Doubles Draw

WOW Tennis Challenger
Waterloo Challenger